Godfrey (died 1135) was a medieval Bishop of Bath.

Life

Godfrey was a native of Leuven and was chaplain to Adeliza of Louvain, second wife of King Henry I of England. Godfrey served as chaplain both before and after her marriage to the king. He came with her to England when she married Henry I.

Godfrey was nominated 25 March 1123, and consecrated 26 August 1123 by Archbishop William de Corbeil of Canterbury at St. Paul's London. During the last years of King Henry I's rule, Godfrey was often at the king's court and received a number of charters from the king.

Godfrey died on 16 August 1135 and was buried in Bath Abbey near the north altar.

Citations

References

Further reading

 

Bishops of Bath
1135 deaths
Year of birth unknown
12th-century English Roman Catholic bishops
Clergy from Leuven